Alex Kapp (born October 18, 1994 in Queens, New York) is an American soccer goalkeeper.

Career

Early and collegiate
Kapp attended Iona Preparatory School in New Rochelle, New York where he participated in soccer and football. Kapp earned All-City and All-State honors during his Junior and Senior years at Iona Prep. He also participated in the 2011 High School All-American Game and was chosen to train with the USA U-17 men's national team. At Iona, Kapp also played as the placekicker for the football team. Kapp also developed as a player by playing for FC Westchester Academy. Kapp attended Boston College where he Redshirt (college sports) his freshman year before playing for 3 more years. For his final season in college, Kapp transferred to Creighton University.

Professional
Kapp was selected by Atlanta United in the 4th round of the 2017 MLS SuperDraft with the 68th pick. Atlanta United chose not to sign Kapp, however, so he remained as a free agent until he was signed by Minnesota United on August 8, 2017.

Kapp was released by Minnesota at the end of their 2018 season.

Personal life
Kapp is the son of former professional soccer player Erhardt Kapp.

References

External links
 
 gocreighton.com
 

1994 births
Living people
American soccer players
Association football goalkeepers
Atlanta United FC draft picks
Boston College Eagles men's soccer players
Creighton Bluejays men's soccer players
Minnesota United FC players
People from Somers, New York
Pittsburgh Riverhounds SC players
Sportspeople from Queens, New York
Soccer players from New York City
USL Championship players